Hemsworth Miners Welfare Football Club is a football club based in Hemsworth, West Yorkshire, England.

History
The club was established in 1981 after Hemsworth Colliery Football Club folded the year before. The new club joined Division Three of the Doncaster & District Senior League. A third-place finish in 1985–86 saw the club promoted to Division Two, and another third-place finish the following season resulted in a second successive promotion to Division One. In 1987–88 they were Division One runners-up, securing a third straight promotion and entry to the Premier Division.

Hemsworth won the Premier Division Cup in 1994–95, after which they joined the West Riding County League. In 1996–97 they won the Division title and the Division One Cup and were promoted to the Premier Division. The following year they won the Premier Division Cup, a feat repeated in 2001–02. In 2007–08 a fourth-place finish in the Premier Division was enough to earn promotion to Division One of the Northern Counties East League. They were Division One champions in 2015–16, earning promotion to the Premier Division.

Season-by-season record

Honours
Northern Counties East League
Division One champions 2015–16
Doncaster FA Challenge Cup
Winners 1995–96
West Riding County Amateur League
Division One champions 1996–97
Premier Division Cup winners 1997–98, 2001–02
Division One Cup winners 1996–97
Doncaster Senior League 
Premier Division Cup winners 1994–95
Sheffield Junior Cup
Winners 1997–98

Records
Best FA Cup performance: Preliminary round, 2010–11, 2012–13, 2016–17
Best FA Vase performance: Second round, 2015–16, 2016–17
Record attendance: 505 vs Kinsley Boys, 2007
Biggest win: 19–0 v Highfields
Heaviest defeat: 1–10 v Blue Bell
Most appearances: Stuart Clark, 811
Most goals: Stuart Clark, 377
Most goals in a season: Paul Crapper, 52
Most goals in a game: Damien Liddle, 10

References

External links
Official website

Football clubs in England
Football clubs in West Yorkshire
1981 establishments in England
Association football clubs established in 1981
Sheffield & Hallamshire County FA members
Doncaster & District Senior League
West Riding County Amateur Football League
Northern Counties East Football League
Hemsworth
Mining association football teams in England